Room at the Top is a 1959 British film based on the 1957 novel of the same name by John Braine. It was adapted by Neil Paterson (with uncredited work by Mordecai Richler), directed by Jack Clayton (his feature-length debut), and produced by John and James Woolf. The film stars Laurence Harvey, Simone Signoret, Heather Sears, Donald Wolfit, Donald Houston, and Hermione Baddeley.

The film was widely lauded, and it was nominated for six Academy Awards, winning two: Best Actress (Signoret) and Best Adapted Screenplay (Paterson). Its other nominations at the 32nd Academy Awards were for Best Picture, Best Director (Clayton), Best Actor (Harvey), and Best Supporting Actress (Baddeley). Baddeley's performance, consisting of 2 minutes and 19 seconds of screen time, is the shortest ever to be nominated for an acting Oscar.

Plot
In 1947, in the West Riding of Yorkshire, England, Joseph (Joe) Lampton, an ambitious young man, moves from his hometown, the dreary factory town of Dufton, to the somewhat larger town of Warnley to assume a secure, but poorly paid and dead-end, post in the Borough Treasurer's Department. Determined to get ahead, and ignoring the warnings of his colleague and roommate Charlie Soames, he pursues Susan Brown, the daughter of a local industrial magnate. She has been dating wealthy Jack Wales, but Joe is able to charm her. Mr and Mrs Brown attempt to deal with Joe's social climbing by having Joe's boss encourage him to pursue a woman of his own class; getting him a job offer back in Dufton, which he refuses when he discovers the machination; and sending Susan on a trip abroad, but Susan remains smitten.

While he is wooing Susan, Joe also begins to see Alice Aisgill, an unhappily married Frenchwoman ten years his senior who came to England as a teacher a decade earlier and married George Aisgill, a haughty and abusive upper-class Englishman who is now having an affair with his secretary. Joe thinks he is just killing time with Alice and Alice says they can just be "loving friends". Their feelings for each other begin to turn into something more and Joe starts to lose interest in his pursuit of Susan. The relationship is passionate, tempestuous and after a particularly heated argument, Joe switches his focus back to Susan. He manages to take her virginity but is unsatisfied and finds himself drawn back to Alice.

Joe and Alice go away for a vacation and Alice is overjoyed that Joe seems to have decided to end his quest for wealth and social status in favour of simply being happy with himself and with her. They decide she will ask for a divorce when she gets home but when she does, George refuses and declares he will ruin Joe and Alice, both socially and financially, if their relationship continues. While Joe is brooding over this, Mr Brown delivers the news that Susan is pregnant and that he expects Joe to stop seeing Alice and marry Susan, in which case Joe can come work for him for a large salary.

Seeing no way around his obstacles to a relationship with Alice, Joe tells her that he is going marry Susan. The heartbroken Alice gets drunk in a pub and the next morning, while his co-workers are celebrating his engagement, Joe hears that she drove her car off a cliff to which she and he used to go together and died slowly over the course of several hours. Devastated, Joe leaves the office and wanders to the flat where he and Alice had their trysts but Alice's friend Elspeth, who owns the flat, drives him away by screaming at him and blaming him for Alice's death.

Joe goes to a pub on the waterfront, where a woman named Mavis comes on to him because he is well-dressed. Although he is very drunk and does not seem very interested in her (he calls her Alice), Joe keeps a man from taking Mavis away against her will. When Joe is alone, the man and some of his friends beat Joe unconscious. In the morning, Charlie finds Joe lying in the street with a battered face but Joe's only concern is his guilt over what he feels he led Alice to do.

A short time later, Joe and Susan get married. With a rich wife and high-paying job, he has got everything he thought he wanted. As they are driven away after the wedding, Susan's effusive praise of the ceremony halts when she notices there are tears in Joe's eyes, which she interprets as him being "really sentimental, after all".

Main cast

 Simone Signoret as Alice Aisgill
 Laurence Harvey as Joe Lampton
 Heather Sears as Susan Brown
 Donald Wolfit as Mr Brown
 Donald Houston as Charlie Soames
 Hermione Baddeley as Elspeth
 Allan Cuthbertson as George Aisgill
 Raymond Huntley as Mr Hoylake
 John Westbrook as Jack Wales
 Ambrosine Phillpotts as Mrs Brown
 Richard Pasco as Teddy Merrick
 Beatrice Varley as Joe's Aunt
 Delena Kidd as Eva
 Ian Hendry as Cyril
 April Olrich as Mavis
 Mary Peach as June Samson
 Anthony Newlands as Bernard
 Avril Elgar as Miss Gilchrist
 Thelma Ruby as Miss Breith
 Paul Whitsun-Jones as Laughing Man at Bar (who tells Joe a joke at the dance)
 Derren Nesbitt as Thug in Fight on Tow Path (Mavis' possessive boyfriend)
 Derek Benfield as Man in Bar (uncredited)
 Richard Caldicot as Taxi Driver (uncredited)
 Wendy Craig as Joan (uncredited)
 Basil Dignam as Priest (uncredited)
 Everley Gregg as Mayoress (uncredited)
 Jack Hedley as Architect (uncredited)
 Miriam Karlin as Gertrude (uncredited)
 Wilfrid Lawson as Joe's Uncle Nat (uncredited)
 Prunella Scales as Council Office Worker (uncredited)
 Julian Somers at St Clair (uncredited)
 John Welsh as Mayor (uncredited)

Adaptation
There are some differences between Braine's novel and the film. For one, Joe's friend Charlie Soames is a friend from his hometown of Dufton in the novel, whereas, in the film, he meets Charlie in Warnley (which is called Warley in the book). Also, in the book, more is made of Joe's lodging at the Thompsons', which, in the novel, he arranged before his arrival in Warley (in the film, Charlie arranges it soon after they meet): it is through his association with the Thompsons that Joe is able to gain entry to a higher social circle than that to which he had previously had access, and Mrs Thompson's room is noted as being at "the top" of Warley geographically, which serves as a metaphor for Joe's social-climbing.

Production
Producer James Woolf bought the film rights to Braine's novel, originally intending to cast Stewart Granger as Joe and Jean Simmons as Susan. Vivien Leigh was originally offered the part of Alice. Woolf hired Clayton as director after seeing The Bespoke Overcoat, an Academy-Award-winning short film that was produced and distributed by companies founded by the Woolf brothers.

Shooting
For the production, in addition to filming on sets at Shepperton Studios in Surrey, there was extensive location-shooting in Halifax, Yorkshire, which stood in for the fictional towns of Warnley and Dufton. Greystones, a large mansion in the Savile Park area of Halifax, was used as the location for exterior scenes of the Brown family mansion; Halifax railway station doubled as Warnley Station in the film; and Halifax Town Hall was used as the Warnley Town Hall. The wedding was filmed at All Souls church, Boothtown, Halifax. Some scenes were also filmed in Bradford, notably the one in which Joe travels on a bus and spots Susan in a lingerie shop and those outside the amateur dramatics theatre.

Reception
The film was critically acclaimed and marked the beginning of Jack Clayton's career as an important director. It was the third most popular film at the British box office in 1959 (after Carry On Nurse and Inn of the Sixth Happiness), grossing $700,000.

Room at the Top is seen as the first of the British New Wave of kitchen-sink-realism film dramas. It was followed by a sequel in 1965 titled Life at the Top.

Awards and nominations

See also
 Life at the Top – the 1965 sequel
 Man at the Top – a 1970 TV series featuring Joe Lampton in later life
 Room at the Top - a 2012 two-part TV adaptation by BBC.
 BFI Top 100 British films

References

External links
 
 
 
 
 
 

1959 films
British drama films
Films featuring a Best Actress Academy Award-winning performance
Films directed by Jack Clayton
British black-and-white films
Films set in Yorkshire
Films based on British novels
Films based on works by John Braine
Films scored by Mario Nascimbene
Films whose writer won the Best Adapted Screenplay Academy Award
Films set in the 1940s
Adultery in films
Best Film BAFTA Award winners
Best British Film BAFTA Award winners
Social realism in film
1959 directorial debut films
1950s English-language films
1950s British films